"Hey Little Sweetie" is the ninth single to be released by Little Man Tate. It was released on 8 September 2008 and reached #142 in the UK Singles Chart

Track listings 
CD
 "Hey Little Sweetie"
 "Nigel"
 "Pay Days Thursday"

7" Picture Disc
 "Hey Little Sweetie"
 "Nigel"

Download
 "Hey Little Sweetie" (acoustic)

References

2008 singles
Little Man Tate (band) songs
2008 songs